Pat Farrelly may refer to:

Pat Farrelly (Australian footballer) (1913–2007), Australian rules footballer
Pat Farrelly (racewalker) (1935–2018), Canadian Olympic racewalker